Chris Diamantopoulos (born May 9, 1975) is a Canadian actor. He played Russ Hanneman in the HBO series Silicon Valley and starred in the film The Three Stooges, and the TV series Good Girls Revolt. He currently voices Mickey Mouse in the eponymous television series and The Wonderful World of Mickey Mouse.

Early life
Diamantopoulos grew up splitting his time between Canada and Greece. He is of Greek descent, a practicing member of the Greek Orthodox church, and a fluent Greek speaker.

Career
Diamantopoulos worked on television commercials and professional theatre productions at the age of nine. By the time he turned eighteen, he left home to partake in a series of American national tours. A short time later, he worked on Broadway, where he played leading parts in The Full Monty (2002) and Les Misérables (2003). Diamantopoulos attended East York Collegiate Institute.

He played Robin Williams in Behind the Camera: The Unauthorized Story of Mork & Mindy alongside Erinn Hayes. He has guest-starred in several series, including Kevin Hill, Charmed, The Sopranos, Nip/Tuck and Boston Legal. He played the interior decorator in the miniseries The Starter Wife.

He had a recurring role on State of Mind and guest-voiced on American Dad! in 2009.

On the eighth season of 24, he played U.S. president Allison Taylor's Chief of Staff Rob Weiss. He played Frank Sinatra in The Kennedys. Diamantopoulos played Moe Howard in the 2012 film The Three Stooges.

Since 2013, Diamantopoulos voiced Mickey Mouse, as well as the Vampire and a Mummy in Mickey Mouse, and its follow-up series The Wonderful World of Mickey Mouse, in which he also voiced a laughing fish and a weasel. Although Bret Iwan has voiced Mickey in most media after Wayne Allwine, Diamantopoulos voices the character in retro-styled productions, giving Mickey Mouse a voice similar to that of Walt Disney.

He had recurring roles on the NBC sitcoms Up All Night, as Maya Rudolph's on and off lover, Julian; The Office, as Brian, a former member of the show's documentary film crew (alongside Zach Woods), and on Arrested Development, as Marky, Lindsay's face-blind environmentalist boyfriend.

He appeared in the television sitcom Episodes playing the part of TV network boss Castor Sotto, and Mr. Chris in the television adaptation of About a Boy.

In 2017, Diamantopoulos starred in the musical Waitress on Broadway.

On October 11, 2018, it was revealed by TVLine that he would have a role in the spin-off pilot for the situation comedy The Middle playing Sue Heck's mercurial, charming and rich boss Nick.

Diamantopoulos voiced Frank Heffley in the 2021 animated film Diary of a Wimpy Kid, released on Disney+.

Personal life
He met Becki Newton at a subway station in New York City. They married in 2005. Newton gave birth to their first child, a boy, in November 2010. In 2014, they had a girl.

Filmography

Film

Television

Stage

Video games

Theme park attractions

References

External links
 
 

1975 births
Living people
Canadian expatriate male actors in the United States
Canadian male comedians
Canadian male film actors
Canadian male television actors
Canadian male video game actors
Canadian male voice actors
Canadian people of Greek descent
Comedians from Toronto
Disney people
Eastern Orthodox Christians from Canada
Male actors from Toronto
Male actors from Los Angeles
20th-century Canadian male actors
21st-century Canadian male actors